MPH Entertainment, Inc. is an American production company, focusing on feature films, television series, and specials. It was founded in January 1996 by Jim Milio, Melissa Jo Peltier, Mark Hufnail and Nirupam Trivedi.  They are best known for being co-executive producers for the independent film My Big Fat Greek Wedding, and producers of the hit National Geographic Channel series, Dog Whisperer.

External links 
 Official website
 The Original Dog Whisperer

Mass media companies established in 1996
Television production companies of the United States
Film production companies of the United States